Presidential Studies Quarterly is a quarterly peer-reviewed political science journal dedicated to the scholarly study of the presidency of the United States. It was established in 1971 as Center House Bulletin, obtaining its current name in 1974. It is published by Wiley-Blackwell on behalf of the Center for the Study of the Presidency and Congress. The editor-in-chief is George C. Edwards III (Texas A&M University). According to the Journal Citation Reports, the journal has a 2017 impact factor of 0.908, ranking it 104th out of 169 journals in the category "Political Science".

References

External links

Wiley-Blackwell academic journals
Quarterly journals
Publications established in 1971
Political science journals
English-language journals